South West Wiltshire is a constituency represented in the House of Commons of the UK Parliament by Andrew Murrison, a Conservative, since its creation in 2010.

History
The constituency was created for the 2010 general election, following the Fifth Periodic Review of Westminster constituencies tasked to the Boundary Commission, by which Parliament increased the number of seats in the county from six to seven.

The previous Westbury constituency was abolished: the northern part (including the town of Bradford-on-Avon) was transferred to the reinstated Chippenham seat, and the southern part (including the towns of Trowbridge, Warminster, and Westbury) formed the bulk of this constituency, which to complete it, received a minority of wards from the Salisbury seat.

Boundaries

The former District of West Wiltshire wards of Dilton Marsh, Ethandune, Mid Wylye Valley, Shearwater, Southwick and Wingfield, Summerham, Trowbridge Adcroft, Trowbridge College, Trowbridge Drynham, Trowbridge John of Gaunt, Trowbridge Park, Warminster East, Warminster West, Westbury Ham, and Westbury Laverton, and the former District of Salisbury wards of Donhead, Fonthill and Nadder, Knoyle, Tisbury and Fovant, and Western and Mere.

Constituency profile
As well as the county town of Trowbridge and the former market towns of Westbury and Warminster (the latter with a considerable Army presence), the seat covers a large rural area with smaller settlements. Residents' health and wealth are around the UK average.

Members of Parliament

Elections

Elections in the 2010s

See also
List of parliamentary constituencies in Wiltshire

Notes

References

Parliamentary constituencies in South West England
Parliamentary constituencies in Wiltshire
Constituencies of the Parliament of the United Kingdom established in 2010